Olga Marie Pauline Plümacher (née Hünerwadel; 27 May 1839 – 1895) was a Russian-born Swiss-American philosopher and scholar. She engaged with the philosophies of the German philosophers Arthur Schopenhauer and Eduard von Hartmann, and published three books which contributed to the pessimism controversy in Germany. Her book on the history of philosophical pessimism, Der Pessimismus in Vergangenheit und Gegenwart ("Pessimism in the Past and Present") was influential on Friedrich Nietzsche and Samuel Beckett.

Biography 
Plümacher was born in St. Petersburg, Russia on 27 May 1839. She was the daughter of Gottlieb Samuel and Adelheid Hünderwadel (his cousin). The family moved to Switzerland where her father managed a steel plant and later retired to Zürich, where Plümacher grew up. She married a German sea captain, Eugene Hermann Plümacher, who later worked as U.S. Consul to Venezuela; they had two children. Plümacher had no formal university education.

Plümacher was friends with a former classmate who was the mother of the German playwright Frank Wedekind and introduced him to the philosophies of Arthur Schopenhauer and Eduard von Hartmann, of whom Plümacher was a devotee; she has been described as Wedekind's "philosophical aunt".

Plümacher later emigrated with her family to the United States and lived in Beersheba Springs, Tennessee, where she published three books in Germany that engaged with the philosophies of Schopenhauer and Von Hartmann: Der Kampf um's Unbewusste ("The Battle for the Unconscious"), Zwei Individualisten der Schopenhauer'schen Schule ("Two Individualists of the Schopenhauer School"), and Der Pessimismus in Vergangenheit und Gegenwart ("Pessimism in the Past and Present"). These works made Plümacher a significant figure within the pessimism controversy in Germany. Der Pessimismus in Vergangenheit und Gegenwart was influential on Friedrich Nietzsche, whose personal copy he annotated throughout. 

Plümacher also published several articles on psychology, philosophy and metaphysics in several German journals. Additionally, she published an article on Von Hartmann in English, in the Oxford journal Mind.

Plümacher died in Tennessee, in 1895.

Legacy 
Samuel Beckett first read Der Pessimismus in Vergangenheit und Gegenwart around 1938; his intense interest in the book led him to heavily annotate it throughout and add in blank pages for additional notes.

Plümacher has been compared to Agnes Taubert, another largely forgotten German female philosopher who also played large part in the pessimism controversy, as well as the German-American philosopher Amelie J. Hathaway.

Rolf Kieser, a professor of German at the State University of New York, published a biography of Plümacher in 1990, Olga Plümacher-Hünerwadel, eine gelehrte Frau des neunzehnten Jahrhunderts.

Plümacher was included in the 2022 issue of the British Journal for the History of Philosophy, titled "Lost Voices: Women in Philosophy 1870-1970".

Selected publications

Articles

Books 
 Der Kampf um's Unbewusste (The Struggle for the Subconscious; 1881)
 Zwei Individualisten der Schopenhauer'schen Schule (Two Individualists from the Schopenhauer School; 1881)
 Der Pessimismus in Vergangenheit und Gegenwart (Pessimism in the Past and Present; 1883)

References

Further reading

External links 

 

1839 births
1895 deaths
19th-century American philosophers
19th-century American women writers
19th-century Swiss philosophers
19th-century Swiss women writers
American women philosophers
Philosophers of pessimism
Swiss women philosophers
Writers from Saint Petersburg
Writers from Zürich